Ypsolopha semitessella is a moth of the family Ypsolophidae. It is known from Croatia and North Macedonia.

References

External links

lepiforum.de

Ypsolophidae
Moths of Europe